The Immovable Cultural Monuments of National Significance are buildings, structures, sites, or places in Georgia that have been determined to have nationwide cultural significance by meeting special criteria developed by the Ministry of Culture and are subject to preservation by the state.

The monument must have an outstanding artistic or aesthetic value, be associated with a particularly important historical event, person, or overall national values.

The original list of the Immovable Monuments of Cultural Heritage was approved in the Presidential decree No. 665 of 7 November 2006. Since then, it has been updated several times. After the amendments of 2013, the monument can be defined as having national significance by the resolution of the Government of Georgia based on the submission of the Ministry of Culture.

List of Immovable Cultural Monuments of National Significance

External links 
 Cultural Heritage of Georgia GIS-portal , National Agency for Cultural Heritage Preservation of Georgia
 List of Immovable Cultural Monuments, National Agency for Cultural Heritage Preservation of Georgia

References 

Culture of Georgia (country)